Mascouche is an off-island suburb of Montreal, in southern Quebec, Canada. The city is located on the Mascouche River within the Les Moulins Regional County Municipality and has a population of 51,183, ranking 20th among Quebec municipalities.

The name comes from Algonquin word  meaning "bear plain" in singular.

History
Mascouche (Then known as Saint-Henri-de-Mascouche ) received city status on December 9, 1970, under mayor Gilles Forest.

On June 21, 2021, the city was struck by an EF2 tornado killing one person.

Infrastructure
Montréal/Mascouche Airport, the largest regional airport in Quebec, is three kilometres southeast of the city.

Autoroutes 640 and 25, both major national transportation routes, meet just south of the centre of the city.

Mascouche is connected to Montreal's Central Station by commuter rail via the Mascouche station of the Réseau de transport métropolitain's Mascouche line.

L'Étang-du-Grand-Coteau, an urban park situated in the city centre on Mascouche Boulevard, has the same area as Mount Royal Park in Montreal.

Demographics 

Mayors
André Duval (1955–1965)
Gilles Forest (1965–1983)
Bernard Patenaude (1983–1992)
Richard Marcotte (1992–2012)
Denise Paquette (2012–2013)
Guillaume Tremblay (2013–present)

Education

The Commission scolaire des Affluents operates Francophone public schools. They include:

Primary schools:
L'école Aux 4 Vents
L'école De la Source
L'école La Mennais
L'école des Hauts-Bois
L'école Soleil-Levant
L'école Le Rucher
L'école de La Seigneurie

Secondary schools :
 École secondaire Le Prélude
 École secondaire Du Coteau

One professional school, École L'Impact.

Sir Wilfrid Laurier School Board operates Anglophone public schools:
 Pinewood Elementary School in Mascouche serves the western portion
 Franklin Hill Elementary School in Repentigny serves the eastern portion
 Rosemere High School (all areas) in Rosemere

Famous residents
Mascouche is the hometown of baseball player Éric Gagné.

It is also Émilie Mondor's hometown, a Canadian Olympic athlete, who was a two-time national champion in the women's 5,000 metres.

See also
Mascouche River
Saint Pierre River (Mascouche)
Les Moulins Regional County Municipality
List of cities in Quebec

References

External links

 
Cities and towns in Quebec